Jaroslav Chlebek (born 10 February 1976) is a Slovak football player who plays as a defender. He plays for Czech 2. Liga side Fotbal Třinec where he is captain. Notable former clubs include MFK Ružomberok, SK Dynamo České Budějovice and Slovan Bratislava.

References
 
 Fotbal Trinec player profile

1976 births
Living people
Association football defenders
Slovak footballers
Czech First League players
SK Dynamo České Budějovice players
ŠK Slovan Bratislava players